There are at least 163 named lakes and reservoirs in Lincoln County, Montana.

Lakes
 Alkali Lake, el. 
 Alvord Lake, el. 
 Arnolds Pond, el. 
 Baboon Lake, el. 
 Baker Lake, el. 
 Baney Lake, el. 
 Baree Lake, el. 
 Barnaby Lake, el. 
 Bear Lake, el. 
 Bear Lakes, el. 
 Betts Lake, el. 
 Big Cherry Lake, el. 
 Big Therriault Lake, el. 
 Big Therriault Lake, el. 
 Black Lake, el. 
 Black Lake, el. 
 Blue Lake, el. 
 Bluebird Lake, el. 
 Bootjack Lake, el. 
 Boulder Lakes, el. 
 Bowen Lake, el. 
 Bramlet Lake, el. 
 Bruin Lake, el. 
 Bull Lake, el. 
 Bull Lake, el. 
 China Lake, el. 
 Costich Lake, el. 
 Crater Lake, el. 
 Crystal Lake, el. 
 Crystal Lake, el. 
 Deep Lake, el. 
 Dickey Lake, el. 
 Double Lake, el. 
 Double N Lake, el. 
 Dry Lake, el. 
 Duck Lake, el. 
 Eli Lake, el. 
 Fish Lake, el. 
 Fish Lakes, el. 
 Flower Lake, el. 
 Frank Lake, el. 
 Geiger Lakes, el. 
 Glen Lake, el. 
 Gold Lake, el. 
 Granite Lake, el. 
 Green Lake, el. 
 Gregor Lake, el. 
 Grob Lake, el. 
 Grouse Lake, el. 
 Hagadore Lake, el. 
 Hawkins Lakes, el. 
 Herrig Lake, el. 
 Hidden Lake, el. 
 Hidden Lake, el. 
 Homes Lake, el. 
 Horse Lakes, el. 
 Horseshoe Lake, el. 
 Hoskins Lake, el. 
 Howard Lake, el. 
 Island Lake, el. 
 Jumbo Lake, el. 
 Kearney Lake, el. 
 Kilbrennan Lake, el. 
 Klatawa Lake, el. 
 La Foe Lake, el. 
 Lake Florence, el. 
 Lake Geneva, el. 
 Lake Livermore (historical), el. 
 Lake Osakis, el. 
 Lake Rene, el. 
 Lavon Lake, el. 
 Leigh Lake, el. 
 Leon Lake, el. 
 Libby Lakes, el. 
 Lick Lake, el. 
 Lilypad Lake, el. 
 Little Loon Lake, el. 
 Little Sparr Lake, el. 
 Little Therriault Lake, el. 
 L-Lake, el. 
 Long Lake, el. 
 Loon Lake, el. 
 Loon Lake, el. 
 Loon Lake, el. 
 Lost Lake, el. 
 Lost Lake, el. 
 Lost Lake, el. 
 Lower Cedar Lake, el. 
 Lower Thompson Lake, el. 
 Madden Lake, el. 
 Marl Lake, el. 
 Martin Lake, el. 
 Martin Lake, el. 
 Middle Thompson Lake, el. 
 Miller Lake, el. 
 Milnor Lake, el. 
 Minor Lake, el. 
 Moose Lake, el. 
 Moran Lake (Montana), el. 
 Morgan Lake (Montana), el. 
 Mount Henry Lakes, el. 
 Mud Lake, el. 
 Mud Lake, el. 
 Murphy Lake, el. 
 Myron Lake, el. 
 O'Brien Lake, el. 
 Okaga Lake, el. 
 Othorp Lake, el. 
 Ozette Lake, el. 
 Paradise Lake, el. 
 Phills Lake, el. 
 Plumb Bob Lake, el. 
 Rainbow Lake, el. 
 Rainbow Lake, el. 
 Rainbow Lake, el. 
 Ramsey Lake, el. 
 Rattlebone Lake, el. 
 Rock Lake, el. 
 Rock Lake, el. 
 Rush Lake, el. 
 Sales Lake, el. 
 Savage Lake, el. 
 Schoolhouse Lake, el. 
 Schrieber Lake, el. 
 Shannon Lake, el. 
 Sky Lakes, el. 
 Slee Lake, el. 
 Snowshoe Lakes, el. 
 Sophie Lake, el. 
 Spar Lake, el. 
 Spruce Lake, el. 
 Standard Lake, el. 
 Summerville Lake, el. 
 Swisher Lake, el. 
 Sylvan Lake, el. 
 Tahoka Lake, el. 
 Tepee Lake, el. 
 Tepee Lake, el. 
 Tetrault Lake, el. 
 Thirsty Lake, el. 
 Thompson Lakes, el. 
 Throop Lake, el. 
 Timber Lake, el. 
 Tom Poole Lake, el. 
 Tooley Lake, el. 
 Turtle Lake, el. 
 Upper Bramlet Lake, el. 
 Upper Cedar Lake, el. 
 Upper Thompson Lake, el. 
 Vimy Lake, el. 
 Vinal Lake, el. 
 Weasel Lake, el. 
 Wee Lake, el. 
 Whitney Lake, el. 
 Wishbone Lake, el. 
 Wolverine Lakes, el.

Reservoirs
 Bass Lake, el. 
 Costich Lake, el. 
 Lake Koocanusa, el. 
 Obermayer Lake, el. 
 Troy City Reservoir, el. 
 Troy Dam Reservoir, el.

See also
 List of lakes in Montana

References

Bodies of water of Lincoln County, Montana
Lincoln